"I Don't Wanna Live My Life Like You" is a song by English hard rock musician John Sykes. It was released in 1995 by Mercury Records' Japanese branch as the first single from his debut solo album Out of My Tree. The song was described by Sykes as having a 1970s punk rock-vibe with rebellious lyrics. Sykes jokingly stated that the song is a reflection of his own life with his neighbours.

Track listing
All songs written and composed by John Sykes.

CD (1995)

Personnel
Credits are adapted from the liner notes.

Musicians
John Sykes - guitar, vocals
Marco Mendoza - bass, backing vocals
Tommy O'Steen - drums, backing vocals

References

External links

1995 singles
1995 songs
Mercury Records singles